Metastelma anegadense is a species of plant in the family Apocynaceae. It is endemic to the British Virgin Islands.  Its natural habitats are subtropical or tropical dry shrubland and sandy shores. It is threatened by habitat loss.

References

Flora of the British Virgin Islands
anegadense
Critically endangered plants
Taxonomy articles created by Polbot